is a Japanese manga series written and illustrated by Masamune Shirow, which spawned the media franchise of the same name. It was first serialized in Kodansha's seinen manga magazine Young Magazine Zōkan Kaizokuban from 1989 to 1991, under the subtitle of The Ghost in the Shell and was compiled in one tankōbon volume. Set in the mid-21st-century, it tells the story of the fictional counter-cyberterrorist organization Public Security Section 9, led by protagonist Major Motoko Kusanagi. Ghost in the Shell 2: Man-Machine Interface was the sequel work which follows the story of Motoko after merging with the Puppeteer. The last volume, Ghost in the Shell 1.5: Human-Error Processor, contains four separate cases.

The books contain Shirow's thoughts on design and philosophy, including sociological issues, the consequences of technological advances and themes on the nature of consciousness and identity. Several artbooks have been released to detail the concept art and the world of Ghost in the Shell. All three volumes have received mainly positive reviews.

Synopsis

Setting
Political intrigue and counter-terrorism operations are standard fare for Section 9, but the various actions of corrupt officials, companies, and cyber-criminals in each scenario are unique and require the diverse skills of Section 9's staff to prevent a series of incidents from escalating.

In this cyberpunk iteration of a possible future, computer technology has advanced to the point that many members of the public possess cyberbrains, technology that allows them to interface their biological brain with various networks. The level of cyberization varies from simple minimal interfaces to almost complete replacement of the brain with cybernetic parts, in cases of severe trauma. This can also be combined with various levels of prostheses, with a fully prosthetic body enabling a person to become a cyborg. The heroine of Ghost in the Shell, Major Motoko Kusanagi, is such a cyborg, having had a terrible accident befall her as a child that ultimately required that she use a full-body prosthesis to house her cyberbrain. This high level of cyberization, however, opens the brain up to attacks from highly skilled hackers, with the most dangerous being those who will hack a person to bend to their whims.

Story

 begins in 2029, and features Section 9, led by Chief Daisuke Aramaki and Major Motoko Kusanagi, as they investigate the Puppeteer, a cyber-criminal wanted for committing a large number of crimes by proxy through "ghost hacking" humans with cyberbrains. As the investigation continues, Section 9 discovers that the Puppet Master is actually an advanced artificial intelligence created by a department of the Japanese government, taking up residence in a robot body. After destroying the latest host of the Puppeteer, Section 9 believes all is well, until the Major discovers the Puppet Master in her own mind. After hearing the Puppeteer's wishes to reach its next step in evolution, Kusanagi allows it to become one with her own ghost.

In  the Major leaves Section 9 to work as a private contractor, with the remaining members of the unit, Batou, Togusa, Ishikawa, Saito, Paz, Borma and Azuma, continuing their work as covert operatives, occasionally meeting up with the Major in her various guises.

 takes place in the year 2035, where the Major, now known as Motoko Aramaki, works as a security expert for Poseidon Industrial, now an entity composed of multiple identities that she controls via the network in other prosthetic bodies that attack industrial spies, assassins, and cyber-hackers, solving various crimes, while still at her day job. However, a psychic investigator finds something dangerous emerging as the teachings of a professor of artificial intelligence fall into the wrong hands and attempt to intermingle with the Major's current evolving sense of self.

Production

Creation and development
While writing the manga, Masamune Shirow struggled to make it neither too complex nor too simple. Masamune Shirow originally wanted to use the name "Ghost in the Shell" for the publication, as an homage to Arthur Koestler's The Ghost in the Machine, from which he drew inspiration. Shirow requested that "Ghost in the Shell" be included on the title even if it was in small print. Yuri believes that Kōkaku Kidōtai is the mainstream title while "Ghost in the Shell" is the theme. While most Japanese publications use both names, the original publication in Young Magazine used Kōkaku Kidōtai.

When developing Ghost in the Shell 2: Man-Machine Interface, Shirow initially wanted to use a new title by changing the last kanji character meaning , to the homophonic kanji for  so that it would literally translate , but eventually he decided not to do so. The production of Ghost in the Shell 2: Man-Machine Interface manga was done digitally, which was difficult for Shirow because of troubles including a hard disk failure which resulted in the loss of 16 gigabytes of data, USB hardware troubles and reading manuals related to new application upgrades. Shirow considers the manga a completely different kind of work and not a true sequel of Ghost in the Shell. The original manga revolved around Public Security Section 9 and Ghost in the Shell 2: Man-Machine Interface follows what happens to the Major after she merges with the Puppeteer. Shirow drew the color pages on computer, in which he states was difficult to do due to technical issues with his computer. In the "short-cut" version of the manga, Masamune Shirow made the color darker and softer, but used more contrasting colors in the "standard" version. In the Japanese "Short-cut" version, further changes can be found, most notably an increase in nudity and pornographic scenes.

Design and philosophy
Shirow's thoughts and work on Ghost in the Shell contain numerous footnotes and detailed explanations about scenes to give readers an understanding of the sociological differences or technological advances and philosophical discussion of the material. Examples include concepts like the future of hacking techniques, in which a cyberbrain can be hacked to copy information without being detected. Shirow explains instances of spirit channeling in cyborgs with kiko energy. Shirow even wrote that this phenomenon may be related to the "hearing voices" in individuals that suffer from mental disabilities like schizophrenia. This belief is represented in Motoko's reasons for head hunting Togusa for Section 9. Shirow also notes that he believes these channelers do not speak with a human-like god, but instead tap into a phase of the universe which synchronizes with the channeler's functions. Other philosophical stances are represented such as Shirow's personal beliefs regarding death sentences and crime and punishment.

Shirow explains numerous facets of the daily life throughout his notes in Ghost in the Shell. Cyborgs are shown consuming food, but Shirow noted that early in the development would have been pills or paste substance that would have both psychological and physical functions. The Fuchikoma robots also must consume in a sense, requiring replenishment of fluid for their neurochips every two months, but Fuchikoma are not entirely bio-robots. Shirow discussed in his notes how the family of Yano received notification of his death and what would be disclosed, but also notes strategic use and premature notifications exist for various purposes. The advancement of technology in Shirow's vision of the future is rapid, but the advancements are at least partially related to then-current technology. The concepts of a 3-D viewing room were based on "crude" golf simulator technology.

Other personal beliefs of Shirow are represented in the scenes and author's commentary, such metaphysics, religious references, and other philosophical stances that enter a range of topics including his thoughts on a rotating universe.

Censorship
The removal of a two-page lesbian sex scene in Studio Proteus's localization of Ghost in the Shell was not well received, with readers reacting negatively to the removal of the previously uncensored content that was included in the original Dark Horse release. Toren Smith commented on Studio Proteus's actions claiming that requirement of the "mature readers only" would translate into a 40% loss in sales and likely have caused the immediate cancellation of the series. Shirow, who grew tired of "taking flak" over the pages, opted to remove them and reworked the previous page as necessary.

The sequel volume Ghost in the Shell 2: Man-Machine Interface also featured pornographic scenes and an increase in nudity in the "Short-cut" version in Japan.

Publication history
Ghost in the Shell ran in the Kodansha's manga anthology Young Magazine Kaizokuban from the May 1990 to the November 1991 issues, and was released in tankōbon format on October 2, 1991. Dark Horse initially published it in English monthly into eight comic issues from March 1, 1995, to October 1, 1995, with the translation of Studio Proteus. It was collected into a trade paperback volume on December 1, 1995. An uncensored version was released by Dark Horse Comics on October 6, 2004. The censored version was later republished by Kodansha Comics in 2009 and 2017.

Masamune Shirow penned the sequel Ghost in the Shell 2: Man-Machine Interface and ran in Weekly Young Magazine in 1997. The chapters were collected into a hardcover volume along with its predecessor in a limited-edition box set titled  on December 1, 2000. The box set also contained a booklet titled ManMachine Interface Inactive Module, a poster, and a Fuchikoma robot action figure. The Solid Box version added over 140 pages of new content. The tankōbon version was released on June 26, 2001 and included more changes, such as 24 color pages and over 20 large modifications to existing pages. The manga was then distributed in English by Dark Horse Comics in 11 comic issues from January 29, 2003, to December 31, 2003. Masamune Shirow manually redrew the manga for the English version so that it could be read from left to right. It was collected into a single volume in trade paperback on January 12, 2005. The manga was republished by Kodansha Comics on August 10, 2010.

Four chapters from the sequel's run that were published from 1991 to 1996 and not released in tankōbon format in previous releases were later collected into a single volume titled Ghost in the Shell 1.5: Human-Error Processor. The manga was published on July 23, 2003, by Kodansha. It included a booklet and a CD-ROM featuring the full stories, adding music to the manga scenes, and a screen saver. Dark Horse Comics announced an English version at the 2005 San Diego Comic-Con. The four chapters were each split into two, and released as eight individual comic issues from November 1, 2006, to June 6, 2007, and was the first of the Ghost in the Shell manga released in the United States to read right-to-left. Dark Horse Comics later released it in a single trade paperback volume on October 10, 2007. The manga was later republished by Kodansha Comics on September 25, 2012.

A box set containing the three manga volumes in hardcover and a lithograph by Masamune Shirow was released by Kodansha Comics on December 19, 2017, titled The Ghost in the Shell Deluxe Complete Box Set. Kodansha Comics also plan to compile the three mangas as a single hardcover volume with a new cover art illustrated by Masamune Shirow on January 10, 2023, titled The Ghost in the Shell: Fully Compiled.

In August 2019, it was announced that a sequel to 1.5 by Junichi Fujisaku and Yuki Yoshimoto, titled The Human Algorithm, would be published in September 2019 in Young Magazine. It was published online via Kodansha's Comic Days app. In North America, it was published under Kodansha Comics. In November 2021, after the first part of the series ended, it was announced that the second part would be serialized in the YanMaga Web and Comic Days websites.

Related media

A number of artbooks detailing the concept art and world of Ghost in the Shell have been released. A box set titled  was released on July 8, 1997. The box set contains a collection of posters illustrated by Masamune Shirow, a booklet and a puzzle. A guidebook titled  was published by Kodansha and released on January 16, 1998. An art book titled  was released by Kodansha on July 24, 2000. The book contains several different artwork and paper cut out figures of the Fuchikoma.

The Ghost in the Shell video game was developed by Exact and released for the PlayStation on July 17, 1997, in Japan by Sony Computer Entertainment. It is a third-person shooter featuring an original storyline where the character plays a rookie member of Section 9.

Animation studio Production I.G has produced several different anime adaptations of Ghost in the Shell, starting with the 1995 film of the same name, telling the story of Section 9's investigation of the Puppet Master. The film was followed by a sequel titled Ghost in the Shell 2: Innocence, released in 2004. Meanwhile, a television series release began in 2002 under the title Ghost in the Shell: Stand Alone Complex, telling an alternate story from the manga and first film, featuring Section 9's investigations of government corruption in the Laughing Man and Individual Eleven incidents. The series ran for two seasons of 26 episodes each, with the second season titled Ghost in the Shell: S.A.C. 2nd GIG. In 2006 a sequel film to the S.A.C. series was produced as Ghost in the Shell: Stand Alone Complex - Solid State Society. 2013 saw the start of the Ghost in the Shell: Arise OVA series with a plot set before the events of the original manga and consisting of four parts released through mid-2014. The series was recompiled in early 2015 as a television series titled Ghost in the Shell: Arise - Alternative Architecture, airing with an additional two episodes (one part). An animated feature film produced by most of the Arise staff, titled Ghost in the Shell: The New Movie, was released on June 20, 2015.

A live-action Hollywood adaptation starring Scarlett Johansson as The Major was released in the US on March 31, 2017 by Paramount Pictures.

A VR Noh stage play adaptation ran on August, 2020.

Reception
Ghost in the Shell has received mainly positive reviews. Publishers Weekly praised the manga for its artwork: "Masamune's b&w drawings are dynamic and beautifully gestural; he vividly renders the awesome urban landscape of a futuristic, supertechnological Japan." Leroy Douresseaux of the website ComicBookBin gave the manga an "A" stating: "It is visually potent and often inscrutable, but its sense of wonder and exploration makes its ideas still seem fresh two decades after its debut." Peter Gutiérrez of the website Graphic Novel Reporter praised the manga, writing: "In short, Ghost in the Shell is hard sci-fi of the best possible sort: the type that's so full of both undiluted artfulness and philosophy that it's arguably a must-read even for those who don't usually take to the genre." Greg McElhatton of Read About Comics praised the artwork, however criticized the manga for its story pacing and collection of short adventures stating, "I'm glad I got to experience Shirow's artistic view of the future and am a little interested in the idea of his Intron Depot art books, but on the whole Ghost in the Shell was a massive shell game: flashy and fascinating from a glance, but ultimately empty when you decide to dive in."

Ghost in the Shell 2: Man-Machine Interface has sold over 100,000 copies from its initial printing in Japan. Diamond Comic Distributors ranked the manga #7 in its Top Performing Manga list of 2005. Mike Crandol of Anime News Network criticized the manga for being too complex and overwhelming stating it is "too technical for its own good" but praised the new artwork, stating that Shirow's "canny drawing skills are supplemented by an innovative use of CGI graphics that represent the series' boldest artistic endeavor." Publishers Weekly praised the artwork as "the color and b&w graphics are stunning, brilliantly evoking the nonvisual world of data transmission" but stated that the story can be confusing.

Ghost in the Shell 1.5: Human-Error Processor was ranked #10 in The New York Times Manga Best Seller List on October 19, 2012. Scott Green of Ain't It Cool News praised the manga for its footnotes that "alone are worth the price of admission. The degree to which he apparently takes every aspect seriously and the amount of information he'd like to convey verges on a disorder."

Notes

References
{{Reflist |refs=

<ref name="SAC-Log1">

External links

Kodansha USA publishing page
Madman Entertainment's Australian distribution release site 

Brain–computer interfacing in fiction
Censored comics
Comics adapted into video games
Comics set in the 21st century
Cyberpunk anime and manga
Cyborg comics
Dark Horse Comics titles
 
Kodansha manga
Masamune Shirow
Manga adapted into films
Manga adapted into television series
Seinen manga